The U.L. Hickmon Hardware Store is a historic commercial building at 2nd and Main Streets in Bradford, Arkansas.  It is a single story masonry structure, built out of poured concrete clad in stucco.  It has two storefronts separated by a slightly projecting pier, each with fixed-frame glass display windows flanking recessed double-door entries.  A metal awning extends across the width of the main facade.  Built in 1925, it is unusual period construction within White County for its use of concrete as the primary building material.

The building was listed on the National Register of Historic Places in 1991.

See also
National Register of Historic Places listings in White County, Arkansas

References

Commercial buildings on the National Register of Historic Places in Arkansas
Buildings and structures completed in 1925
National Register of Historic Places in White County, Arkansas
1925 establishments in Arkansas
Hardware stores of the United States